Songs to Remember is an album by Mantovani and His Orchestra. It was released in 1960 by London (catalog nos. SKL-4086 and LL-3149).

It debuted on Billboard magazine's pop album chart on July 25, 1960, peaked at the No. 21 spot, and remained on the chart for 18 weeks.

AllMusic later gave the album a rating of four-and-a-half stars.

Track listing
Side A
 "With These Hands"
 "Faraway Places"
 "A Very Precious Love"
 "Jamaica Farewell"
 "Tenderly"
 "Blue Star"

Side B
 "Gigi"
 "When I Fall in Love"
 "No Other Love"
 "Vaya Con Dios"
 "Two Different Worlds"
 "Tonight"

References

1960 albums
London Records albums
Mantovani albums